The spouse of the prime minister of Israel refers to the wife or husband of the head of government of Israel. It is not an official position or title.

History
The spouse of Israel's prime minister assists him with ceremonial duties and performs various other functions. The wife of the current prime minister, Benjamin Netanyahu, is Sara Netanyahu.

See also
 First Lady of Israel

References

Israel
Israeli women in politics